Alyosha  is a Soviet-era Russian song by composer Eduard Kolmanovsky and poet Konstantin Vanshenkin. The subject is the Alyosha Monument, the common local name for the  statue of a World War II Soviet soldier which stands in the Bulgarian city of Plovdiv as a monument to all Soviet soldiers who died during the fighting in Bulgaria.

Creation of the song
In 1962, Eduard Kolmanovsky visited Bulgaria, including in the city of Plovdiv where the  Alyosha monument stands, where he learned the story of its origin. Kolmanovsky  later shared his notes with poet Konstantin Vanshenkin, who was inspired by the topic and soon wrote a poem.

Kolmanovsky then composed music for the verses. The mournful feeling of the song is achieved with the minor mood of the music and by the lyric which employs both slow repetition:

and pathos:

"Alyosha" was published in 1966 in the Soviet army magazine Sergeant Major/Sergeant in the section dedicated to Bulgarian-Soviet friendship. In 1967, the Soviet Alexandrov Ensemble first performed the song at the foot of the monument. It was performed at the 1968 Ninth World Festival of Youth and Students in Sofia. The song immediately became very popular in Bulgaria. 

In the Soviet Union, the song became popular in a duet by the Bulgarian singers Margret Nikolova and Georgi Kordov.

Until 1989 "Alyosha" was the official anthem of Plovdiv. Every morning Radio Plovdiv started its broadcasts with this song. It was often played during cultural events conducted by the Bulgarian Communist Party, and all Bulgarian primary school students were required to learn it.

The song has also become identified with the Russian monument Defenders of the Soviet Arctic during the Great Patriotic War in Murmansk which is also nicknamed Alyosha, and with other Soviet monuments.

Notes

References

External links
"Alyosha" sung by Philip Kirkorov and Bedros Kirkorov
"Alyosha" sung by Zara

Culture in Plovdiv
Russian military songs
Russian-language songs
Soviet songs
1966 songs
Songs about World War II
Bulgaria–Soviet Union relations